Kazimierz Iwiński (died 29 October 1990, in Warsaw) was a retired senior inspector of the Ministry of Education and Schools of Academic Rank and is (now in the Ministry of Science and Higher Education of the Republic of Poland).

Education
He had an MA in Philosophy.

Career
He taught several generations of young people. He was a scoutmaster, former commander of troops in the Polish Scouting and Guiding Association in  Sarny in Volhynia and Tczew. He was awarded The Order of Polonia Restituta, The Medal of the National Education Commission (Polish: Medal Komisji Edukacji Narodowej), the Golden Badge of the Union of Polish Teachers and other decorations. Underground teaching during WW2.

Publications
He authored the book "Indelible Marks"  (2005).

Personal life
Wife Irena Iwińska (Krauze), children: Stefan, Anna, Adam, Jerzy Olgierd.

References

1990 deaths
Polish Scouts and Guides
Recipients of the Order of Polonia Restituta
Polish educators
20th-century Polish educators
Year of birth missing